Paharia is a genus of cicadas in the family Cicadidae. There are at least four described species in Paharia.

Species
These four species belong to the genus Paharia:
 Paharia lacteipennis (Walker, F., 1850) c g
 Paharia putoni (Distant, 1892) c g
 Paharia semenovi (Oshanin, 1906) c g
 Paharia zevara (Kusnezov, 1931) c g
Data sources: i = ITIS, c = Catalogue of Life, g = GBIF, b = Bugguide.net

References

Further reading

 
 
 
 

Tibicinini
Cicadidae genera